Quincy Jones Plays Hip Hits is an album by  Quincy Jones consisting of songs that were hits for other musicians. It was released by  Mercury in 1963. Featured soloists include Joe Newman, Zoot Sims, and Phil Woods.

Reception

Scott Yanow of Allmusic stated "By 1963, Quincy Jones' music was at a crossroads. Still jazz-oriented, Jones' work with a studio big band was clearly aimed at trying to sell records rather than play creative jazz. ... However, the performances all clock in around three minutes, and the jazz players take solos that often only count as cameos. Pleasant but not particularly substantial music".

Track listing
 "Comin' Home Baby" (Bob Dorough, Ben Tucker) - 2:46
 "Gravy Waltz" (Steve Allen, Ray Brown) - 2:42
 "Desafinado" (Antonio Carlos Jobim, Newton Mendonça) - 2:55
 "Exodus" (Ernest Gold) - 3:20
 "Cast Your Fate to the Wind" (Vince Guaraldi) - 2:45
 "A Taste of Honey" (Ric Marlow, Robert William Scott) - 2:35
 "Back at the Chicken Shack" (Jimmy Smith) - 2:59
 "Jive Samba" (Nat Adderley) - 2:42
 "Take Five" (Paul Desmond) - 3:30
 "Walk On the Wild Side" (Elmer Bernstein, Mack David) - 3:10
 "Watermelon Man" (Herbie Hancock) - 3:20
 "Bossa Nova U.S.A." (Dave Brubeck) - 3:20

Personnel 
 Al Cohn, Frank Wess, James Moody, Roland Kirk, Walter Levinsky, Zoot Sims - saxophone
 Budd Johnson, Jerome Richardson, Seldon Powell, Romeo Penque - reeds
 Al Perisi, Clark Terry, Ernie Royal, James Nottingham, Joe Newman, Snooky Young - trumpet
 Billy Byers, Jimmy Cleveland, Kai Winding, Melba Liston, Paul Faulise, Quentin "Butter" Jackson, Santo Russo, Thomas Mitchell - trombone 
 Earl Chapin, Fred Klein, James Buffington, Julius Watkins, Paul Ingraham, Ray Alonge, Bob Northern, Willie Ruff - french horn
 Charles McCoy - harmonica
 Bobby Scott, Lalo Schifrin, Patti Bown - piano, organ
 Jim Hall, Kenny Burrell, Sam Herman, Wayne Wright - guitar
 Ray Crawford - guitar
 Art Davis, Ben Tucker, Chris White, George Duvivier, Major Holley, Milt Hinton - bass
 Ed Shaughnessy, Ossie Johnson, Rudy Collins - drums
 Bill Costa, Carlos Gomez, George Devins, Jack Del Rio, Charles McCoy, James Johnson, Jose Paula - percussion

See also 
 Quincy Jones discography

References 

1963 albums
Quincy Jones albums
Jazz albums by American artists
Mercury Records albums